Terracon is an action-adventure video game by British studio Picture House released on August 25, 2000, for the Sony PlayStation in Europe and on August 30, 2000, in South Africa. A North American release by Midway was planned, but it was cancelled for unknown reasons.

Plot
The Plutonians, a race of grey aliens to which the game's protagonist, Xed, belongs to, inhabits the planet Pluto of the Solar System. A highly technologically advanced species, the Plutonians were faced with an issue which threatened the very future of their civilisation: overpopulation.

Faced with the consequences of extreme overpopulation, the Plutonians found that their only solution was to colonise other planets in the Solar System, by means of terraforming: turning barren, uninhabitable planets into thriving, hospitable worlds. Thus, the Plutonian' chief scientist, and Xed's sidekick, Doc initiates the Terracon project.

The Terracon consisted of a massive, biological computer; a synthetic brain capable of efficiently controlling the legion of Terracon machines required to terraform and tame the planets' harsh environments. Despite highly variable degrees of success in terraforming, with some planets rendered more hospitable than others, the endeavour was considered a success, and the time came to shut down the Terracon, but not solely because the Terracon had fulfilled its purpose.

As the Terracon began to develop a sense of self-awareness, the Plutonian committee deemed it an imperative to terminate the Terracon, fearing its new-found powers of intelligence could spiral out of control.

Before Xed is due to begin a training session, Doc notifies Xed that they appear to have been involuntarily shut down by the Terracon.

Afterwards, both Doc and Xed board the Terracon's mothership to meet it  in person, and attempt to reason with it, explaining why it needs to be shut down. Doc explains that Plutonian committee decided to shut down the Terracon secretly, without prior notification, but given the Terracon's exemplary service, he chose otherwise. Regardless, the Terracon rejects Doc's shutdown orders, reverses the procedure, and kills him with shot from a Terracon machine.

Xed narrowly escapes from two pursuing machines, before reaching his dropship. The Terracon, in its first act of vengeance, proceeds to obliterate the Greys' home world, stating, 'By my fire, all shall be undone!' As the Terracon mothership looms over the remains of the destroyed planet, Xed's dropship hides from its view on the side of a chunk of the planet's remains. As Xed looks out of its window, he is met with the grim view of the lifeless bodies of his people, floating in space.

Later, on board his dropship, mourning the destruction of his species, Xed, to his amazement, is met by a hologram of Doc. Doc explains that he uploaded his consciousness to Xed's dropship as a 'small precaution'. Doc informs Xed that the only way to destroy the Terracon is by turning the terraformed planets' missile defence systems against it. Doc informs Xed that the missile systems rely on the collection of launch code cartridges (or LCCs). Doc explains, however, that, for security reasons, the cartridges have been disseminated all over each of the terraformed planets.

Xed, guided by the now-holographic Doc, then embarks on a journey through the Solar System to find and collect all the required LCCs, spanning the terraformed worlds of Venus, Jupiter, Neptune, Uranus, Earth, and various moons.

Upon the collection of all the LCCs for each planet, Xed initiates the firing sequence for the planet's defence systems, targeting the Terracon mothership. With each launch of the systems, the Terracon sustains increasing amounts of damage.

Following the final attack on the Terracon, launched from Earth, the Terracon mothership, critically damaged, crash-lands on Earth's moon, preceded by an immense explosion. On Earth, Xed celebrates the destruction of the Terracon with the early hominids, who populate the planet. Xed and the early hominids interbreed to create a new species: modern man.

At an unspecified point in the future, two British astronauts are seen exploring the Moon. One of the astronauts, having discovered a deep cavern, beckons to the other to investigate with him. As the pair of astronauts begin venture into the cave, a walkthrough to the depths of the caves reveals the last remnants of the Terracon module, containing the Terracon still alive within.

Gameplay

Objectives 
The main objective of each level, of which there are over thirty in total, is to collect the required number of launch code cartridges (LCCs) to launch the respective planet's missile defence system at the Terracon mothership. The number of LCCs in a level ranges from one to three. The player usually obtains LCCs by collecting them as they progress through a level; sometimes, however, the player is required to defeat a "boss" enemy to obtain an LCC.

In order to complete the above, the player must achieve a number of objectives, the direction of which is signified by an objective arrow in the top-centre of the display. These include: accessing higher ground, building structures, and defeating enemies. Some levels are completely devoted to against-the-clock missions, whereby the player must sustain themselves against a noxious atmosphere by collecting pick-ups to extend their available time. Whilst most levels take place on-foot, there are a few primarily vehicle-based objectives. There are two types of in-game vehicles: the skimmer, a small, agile watercraft, and the turret. In the latter of the two, for example, the player is required to defend themselves from an onslaught of enemies whilst awaiting rescue via dropship. Although, vehicles are available for usage in some of the "orthodox" levels.

At the end of each level, the player must create a beacon in order to summon their dropship. Beacons, like every other type of mesh, require genergy to create them. Upon generating the beacon, Xed's dropship will appear above a green access-point. The player will be teleported into the dropship upon accessing the access-point.

At the end of each level, the player is notified of the following information: LLCs collected; surplus genergy and life force units; TOPS collected; and number of secrets discovered, all of which vary from level-to-level. If the player has not collected all of the LCCs in a level before accessing the dropship, they cannot progress to the nest, and must begin the level again; the player need not re-collect LCCs, however, as they only require the missing LLC(s).

After the overview, the player is taken to the TOPS replication area. Here, the players genergy surplus and TOPS count from the completed level are converted into points, which can be used to "purchase" all varieties of TOPS (provided they have unlocked them by discovering them throughout the game).

Pick-ups

Genergy 
Genergy is the fundamental pick-up that the player will encounter throughout the course of the game. It, in varying quantities and varieties obtained by the player, introduces a puzzle-solving aspect to the game. Genergy is used to destroy enemies, break open containers, build/destroy a wide variety of structures, and to act of a form of in-game currency.

Genergy takes the form of differently coloured 'clouds' , which the player collects by running into them. There are four different colours of genergy: red, blue, yellow, and green, which, with the exception of green genergy (which acts as a supercharged life force unit), correspond to identically coloured, holographic meshes scattered around virtually all levels.

One of the most frequently occurring uses of genergy is its use in building structures derived from holographic meshes. These meshes, like genergy, appear in three usable colours: red, blue, and yellow. The colour of the mesh signifies the colour of the genergy required to build it.

In their most basic form, these meshes form structures like blocks or bridges, which allow the player traverse water, or access area otherwise inaccessible. These meshes, being hollow depictions of their intended structure, require genergy to become solid structures. As the player collects genergy, it can be used for this purpose. However, each mesh requires varying amounts of genergy in the correct colour to complete it. If the player lacks the required amount, as signified by a bar on the genergy colour's tube on the display, or stands too close to the mesh, the genergy will be returned to the player, and they will receive a notification, in the form of subtitles, that they require more of the corresponding colour, or are stood too close. Genergy is also essential for creating beacons to signify the end of a level.

To build a mesh, the player simply fires the genergy gun in its rough direction. As the genergy bolts are applied to the mesh, it turns partially white, before becoming a solid structure. Occasionally, built meshes can be destroyed, and the genergy subsequently reclaimed. These 'unstable meshes' require the player strategically recycle genergy in order to achieve the various objectives in each level.

Other systems of genergy manipulation appear throughout the game, in the form of structures, sometimes pre-built, sometimes as meshes, which require the player to use genergy even more tactically. These include genergy transformers, which exchange one quantity of genergy into an equal quantity of another, e.g., blue to red. In this example, the player can obtain a new colour of genergy otherwise absent in the level, which allows the construction of the required mesh(es) in order to progress with their current objective. Sometimes, the player will be required to have no quantity of a certain colour of genergy. This  occurs if a player enters a teleportation both. Here, the player would require the use of genergy exchangers to allow them to rid themselves of one colour of genergy by exchanging all of it for another, e.g., if the player requires no yellow genergy, they must convert yellow genergy in blue, using a yellow-to-blue genergy exchanger. Furthermore, certain structures allow the player to gain the upper hand against invincible enemies.

Genergy also has destructive as well as constructive purposes: apart from destroying unstable meshes, it acts as the player's sole system of weaponry against enemies. Enemies can sustain varying numbers of shots of genergy, some are impervious to certain colours of it, and others are not effected by genergy at all.

Indeed, the player will encounter a multitude of enemies and dangers throughout the course of the game. Enemies usually take the form of Terracon machines; some enemies, although confined to a small number of levels, are organic. These appear in a wide variety of types, and attack the player in different ways. Most common of all are the Terracon walkers. These terrestrial, spider-like machines patrol the levels, and if the player strays too close to them, they emit a targeting laser in their direction, before firing a shot at the player. As the player progresses, the enemies they encounter will become increasingly difficult to deal with, as they employ a whole manner of offensive and defensive strategies, including homing missiles, arcs of electricity, aerial ability, and shielding which renders them temporarily invincible. Other non-enemy dangers include: fire, shielding on objects, and lava. Coming into contact with these hazards all cause the player to lose health.

Life Force 
The player's health is based on a one-hundred-point system. If the player sustains damage from an enemy, they lose twenty-five points. Because the player's health count can drop below zero, the player can sustain five hits before dying. Health can be regained by collecting life force units. These are green, cylindrical pick-ups which each restore five health points. The player can obtain life force units by destroying enemies, shooting open containers with the genergy-projector, or, more commonly, by collecting those dotted around the level. Life-force-regenerators are also used in the game's life system.

The player can gain a maximum of four lives, which is achieved by collecting surplus life-force-regenerators, that is, by collecting them while the player's health is already full. As the player collects life-force-regenerators, a helix in the lower-right of the display fills. Once the helix is complete, the players gains a life. Lives are lost if the player's health count reaches zero, falls into a lava pit or, in certain levels, runs out of oxygen. Losing a life requires the player to begin from the last-accessed checkpoint; if, however, the players loses all their lives during the course of a level, they must restart the entire level.

Terracon Outrider Pick-up Systems (TOPS) 
Another important aspect of gameplay are the Terracon outrider pick-up systems (TOPS). TOPS are small, spherical, differently coloured pick-ups which orbit the player upon collection.

There are nine types of TOPS: radar sweeper (blue), which notifies the player of items of interest or danger in them immediate vicinity by means of a 'radar' in the top-left of the display; life-force-regenerator (green), which absorbs incoming damage from enemies, automatically returning lost health; turbo-fire aggregate (dark-purple), which doubles the player's rate of fire, allowing from quicker construction of meshes, or destruction of enemies; auxiliary genergy-projector (red), which, perhaps the most common of TOPS, doubles the number of bolts from the genergy-projector, but maintains the usual rate of fire; holoflage-emitter (orange), which renders the player invisible to enemies, upon sustaining damage; firepower supercharger (light-purple), which allows the player to fire a single shot of charged genergy; micro missile-launcher (yellow), which launches small, homing missiles with each shot, tracking enemies as well as destroyable objects; and time-delay unit (grey), which is seen only in levels where the player must race to the end to avoid a noxious atmosphere, and replenishes the player's oxygen in the form of seconds of breathability.

The player can carry a maximum of four TOPS; upon collecting a fifth, once of the player's current TOPS, selected at random, is ejected from the player's collection. Completing a level with TOPS in-tow allows the player to earn TOPS replication points, which vary in accordance with their rarity and usefulness. Before beginning a level, the player can 'buy' TOPS from the TOPS replication screen using amassed points, giving them an instant advantage in the beginning of the level.

Players can also discover secrets in each level. The number encountered in each varies greatly. They are usually found by collecting items, e.g., life force units or TOPS, off the beaten track. Although an ever-present aspect of gameplay, secrets do not grant the player any bonuses, nor do they contribute to the overall percentage of game completion.

Level Design 
Due to varying degrees of success during the terraforming processes, each planet has a distinct environment type: Jupiter and Venus are temperate planets, the former of which has many drought-stricken areas; Earth is  lush and filled with wildlife; Uranus is locked in a permanent winter of snowy environments; and Neptune, in total contrast to the others, is a dull, murky world, of mutant plant life (constituting the game's only organic in-game enemies), and toxic atmospheres. The environmental effects encountered in each level can vary wildly, changing as the player progresses through the level, and includes weather effects, such as rain; a day-night cycle; and lethal meteor showers. The planets' environments also contain a number of human- built sculptures and structures, including pyramids, moai, obelisks, and dolmen. Along with wildlife, early hominids also inhabit the planets, and appear to have been responsible for building the aforementioned structures.

Characters

Xed: An alien hatched at mammary central just like his 27 brothers and 15 sisters. From an early age, Xed was bad tempered and had an aversion to machines. As soon as he was of age, Xed was put into the newly formed terraforming service where he could focus his destructive energies to the benefit of the common good. Xed quickly gained a reputation of being a loner and could always be found terraforming away from the others, and in particular the machines run by the Terracon brain.

Doc: An alien who started off as a flight engineer working on the Plutonian dropship programme. During the early part of his career, he constructed a biologically grown computer granting him his advanced science doctor's degree. Having perfected the Plutonian dropship design he resigned stating: "It isn't exactly rocket science". Doc transferred to the newly formed Plutonian terraforming project, and soon become a leading scientist on the research project that would turn lifeless planets in the Solar System into green havens to be colonised by the dangerously over-populated Plutonians. Having downloaded the entire contents of his mind into a computer, Doc now lives aboard Xed's dropship. Not only does Doc pilot the ship, but he also keeps Xed informed with up-to-the-minute information with his mission briefings and map screens.

References

External links
Official Terracon website

2000 video games
Europe-exclusive video games
PlayStation (console) games
PlayStation (console)-only games
Science fiction video games
Sony Interactive Entertainment games
Video games about alien visitations
Video games about ancient astronauts
Video games about extraterrestrial life
Video games developed in the United Kingdom
Video games scored by Jim Croft